This list of museums in Portland, Oregon encompasses museums defined for this context as institutions (including nonprofit organizations, government entities, and private businesses) that collect and care for objects of cultural, artistic, scientific, or historical interest and make their collections or related exhibits available for public viewing. Museums that exist only in cyberspace (i.e., virtual museums) are not included. Also included are non-profit and university art galleries.

Museums

Defunct museums
 American Advertising Museum, closed 2004
 The Faux Museum, closed January 2015
 Velveteria, closed January 2010
Museum of Contemporary Craft, closed 2016.

See also
 List of museums in Oregon

References

External links

 Oregon Museums Association

 
Museums in Portland
Portland
Museums